Sir Arthur Percy Morris Fleming  (16 January 1881 – 14 September 1960) was an English electrical engineer, researcher director, and engineering educator.

Education and career
After education at Portland House Academy in Newport and at Finsbury Technical College in London, Fleming worked for the London Electric Supply Corporation and then for Elliott Brothers, Lewisham. He was selected by British Westinghouse for training as one of the 'Holy Forty' who would train with its American parent company before taking up junior posts at the British Westinghouse works in Trafford Park, Manchester. Fleming spent the years from 1899 to 1902 with Westinghouse Electric Company at its East Pittsburgh, Pennsylvania works before returning to take up a post in Trafford Park. He became an insulation specialist and then the Chief Transformer Designer. Fleming introducing a training programme for apprentice recruits, first in the transformer department and then in 1908 throughout British Westinghouse.

British Westinghouse created in 1913 a separate transformer department with Fleming as Superintendent and Chief Engineer, sponsored in 1914 a corporate trade apprentice school directed by him, and in 1917 made him Manager of the corporate education department. During WW I, Fleming lead a research team which made important progress in electrical technology for detecting submarines. In 1919 British Westinghouse was merged into Metropolitan-Vickers.

During the 1920s Fleming played an important role in the progress of the research department of Metropolitan-Vickers.

In 1931 the holding company Associated Electrical Industries, the parent company of Metropolitan-Vickers, appointed Fleming its director of research and education. He continued in this directorship until his retirement in 1954.

Personal life
In 1904 he married Rose Mary Ash of Newport, Isle of Wight. They had two sons, Jack Morris and Gerald Morris, and one daughter, Ruth Mary.

Awards and honours
1920 — CBE for work on technology for submarine detection
1924 — Invited Speaker of the International Congress of Mathematicians in Toronto
1937 — Hawksley Medal awarded by the Institution of Mechanical Engineers
1941 — Faraday Medal awarded by the Institution of Electrical Engineers
1945 — Knighthood for his services to education

Selected publications
with R. Johnson: 
with R. S. Baily: 
with J. G. Pearce: 
with H. J. Brocklehurst: 
with J. G. Pearce: 
with H. J. Brocklehurst:

References

1881 births
1960 deaths
People from Newport, Isle of Wight
English electrical engineers
Metropolitan-Vickers people
Knights Bachelor
Commanders of the Order of the British Empire